West Lake is a lake that is located west of the Hamlet of Canada Lake. The outlet of West Lake is Canada Lake. Fish species present in the lake are pickerel, black bullhead, white sucker, rock bass, carp, yellow perch, and pumpkinseed sunfish. There is a state owned hard surface ramp off Point Breeze Road.

References

Lakes of New York (state)
Lakes of Fulton County, New York